Senna may refer to:

Individuals
 Ayrton Senna (1960–1994), Brazilian F1 driver and triple World Champion
 Bruno Senna (born 1983), F1 driver and nephew of Ayrton Senna
 Danzy Senna (born 1970), novelist
 Lorraine Senna, American film and television director
 Marcos Senna (born 1976), Brazilian-Spanish football player
 Márcio Senna (born 1981), Brazilian football player, Marcos's brother
 Mohammad Ibrahim Abu Senna (born 1937), Egyptian poet
 Viviane Senna (born 1958), IAS president and sister of Ayrton Senna
 Senna Gammour (born 1979), German singer and member of Monrose (2006–2011)
 Senna Proctor (born 1998), British racing driver
 Senna Ušić-Jogunica (born 1986), Croatian volleyball player

Fictional characters
 Senna Galan, a character in the American action-drama TV series Matador. She is the daughter of Andrés Galan, one of the protagonists.
 Senna Refa, a character in the Babylon 5 novel Legions of Fire – Out of the Darkness. She is the daughter of Antono Refa
 Senna is also the name of another, unrelated Centauri woman; the governess seen in Babylon 5: In the Beginning. She was an old retainer of House Jaddo.
 Senna Tōno, a character in the visual novel W Wish series.
 Senna Wales, a witch in the Everworld fantasy series for young adults by K. A. Applegate
 Senna, a character in the movie Bleach: Memories of Nobody
Senna, a character in the League of Legends series
 Senna is the mother of Avatar Korra in the Nickelodeon animated series Avatar: The Legend of Korra

Plants
 Senna (plant), a genus of legumes
 Formerly, plants in Cassia (genus) which used to include Senna
 Black senna the Scrophulariaceae genus Seymeria
 Bladder sennas, the legume genus Colutea
 Scorpion sennas, plants in the legume genera Coronilla and Hippocrepis

Places
 Senna, a Kurdish city in western Iran

Other
 Senna (poetic), an exchange of insults found in the Poetic Edda
 Senna (film), a 2010 documentary film about Ayrton Senna
 McLaren Senna, a British mid-engined sports car, honouring Ayrton Senna
 Senna glycoside, a laxative

See also
 Sena (disambiguation)
 Siena (disambiguation)
 Sienna (disambiguation)